Osbert Peake, 1st Viscount Ingleby, PC (30 December 1897 – 11 October 1966) was a British Conservative Party politician. He served as Minister of National Insurance and then as Minister of Pensions and National Insurance from 1951 to 1955.

Early life
Peake was educated at Eton before training at the Royal Military College, Sandhurst. He served with the Coldstream Guards during the First World War, before joining the Sherwood Rangers Yeomanry.

He entered Christ Church, Oxford in 1919 and graduated in history in 1921. In 1923 he was called to the bar at the Inner Temple.

Career
After unsuccessfully contesting Dewsbury in 1922, Peake entered Parliament as Member of Parliament (MP) for Leeds North in 1929.

In April 1939, he was appointed as Parliamentary Under-Secretary of State for the Home Department and in October 1944 he became Financial Secretary to the Treasury. Whilst in opposition, he became a leading spokesman for the Beveridge social reform proposals, and on the Conservatives return to power in 1951 he became Minister of National Insurance (Minister of Pensions and National Insurance from September 1953 and a member of the Cabinet from October 1954).

In December 1955, shortly after Anthony Eden succeeded Winston Churchill as Prime Minister in April, Peake resigned from the government.

Personal life
On 19 June 1922 Peake married Lady Joan Rachel de Vere Capell (1899–1979), younger daughter of George Capell, 7th Earl of Essex and Adele Capell, Countess of Essex.  They had five children:

 Iris Irene Adele Peake, MVO (1923–2021), a lady-in-waiting to Princess Margaret from 1952 to 1963, married Captain Oliver Payan Dawnay, CVO in 1963.
 Sonia Mary Peake (1924–2009), married David Hay, 12th Marquess of Tweeddale, mother of twin sons Edward Hay, 13th Marquess of Tweeddale and David Hay, 14th Marquess of Tweeddale.
 Martin Raymond Peake, 2nd (and last) Viscount Ingleby (1926–2008)
 Imogen Clarissa Peake (1934–1937)
 Mary Rose Peake (b. 1940), who married Everard John Robert March Phillipps de Lisle.

Honours
Peake became a Privy Counsellor in 1943 and was raised to the peerage on 17 January 1956 as Viscount Ingleby, of Snilesworth in the North Riding of the County of York. On his death in 1966, he was succeeded in the viscountcy by his only son, Martin.

Arms

Footnotes

References

External links 
 

1897 births
1966 deaths
Alumni of Christ Church, Oxford
British Army personnel of World War I
Coldstream Guards officers
Conservative Party (UK) MPs for English constituencies
English barristers
Graduates of the Royal Military College, Sandhurst
Members of the Privy Council of the United Kingdom
Ministers in the Churchill wartime government, 1940–1945
People educated at Eton College
Sherwood Rangers Yeomanry officers
Peake, Osbert
Peake, Osbert
Peake, Osbert
Peake, Osbert
Peake, Osbert
Peake, Osbert
Peake, Osbert
UK MPs who were granted peerages
Ministers in the Churchill caretaker government, 1945
Ministers in the Chamberlain wartime government, 1939–1940
Ministers in the Chamberlain peacetime government, 1937–1939
Viscounts created by Elizabeth II
Ministers in the third Churchill government, 1951–1955
Ministers in the Eden government, 1955–1957